Off the Rack is an American sitcom television series set in the Los Angeles garment industry that aired on ABC from March 15 until April 19, 1985. The series stars Ed Asner and Eileen Brennan and was originally directed by Noam Pitlik. Its taping location was the ABC Television Center in Hollywood.

It was canceled after six regular episodes and one half-hour pilot, which aired as a special on December 7, 1984 (in which the locale was originally New York; the network insisted the setting be changed to Los Angeles for the series). Off the Rack premiered as a regular series in the middle of the 1984–1985 television season as a mid-season replacement on ABC on the same day as Mr. Belvedere. Writer Lissa Levin and director Noam Pitlik would go on to work for that series, following Off the Rack's cancellation.

Cast
Ed Asner as Sam Waltman
Eileen Brennan as Kate Halloran
Pamela Brull as Brenda Patagorski
William Brian Curran as J.P. (pilot)
Dennis Haysbert as Cletus Maxwell
Sandy Simpson as Skip Wagner
Claudia Wells as Shannon Halloran
Cory Yothers as Timothy Halloran (6 episodes) 
R.J. Williams as Timothy Halloran (pilot)

Episodes

References

External links 
 

1985 American television series debuts
1985 American television series endings
1980s American sitcoms
1980s American workplace comedy television series
American Broadcasting Company original programming
English-language television shows
Television shows set in Los Angeles
Television series by Warner Bros. Television Studios